The 2021 Nigerian House of Representatives elections are called to fill vacant seats in the House of Representatives.

Background 
The 360 members of the House of Representatives are elected from single-seat constituencies using first-past-the-post voting; when vacancies occur, by-elections (or bye-elections) are called, scheduled, and administered by the Independent National Electoral Commission. New elections are also called if the general election was annulled by a court or election tribunal with these elections being referred to as supplementary elections if the election is only held in certain polling units and as rerun elections if the election held throughout the entire constituency.

Elections

Summary

Magama/Rijau Federal Constituency by-election rerun 

On December 2, 2019, Magama/Rijau Representative Ja’afaru Iliyasu (APC) died from an unknown illness. In March 2020, Kasimu Danjuma of the APC won the ensuing by-election over the PDP's Emmanuel Alamu and the APGA's Shehu Saleh Rijau, 47%-34%-18%; however, on September 21, the Election Petitions Tribunal disqualified Danjuma for forged documentation and annulled the election. In November 2020, the decision was upheld by a Court of Appeal which ordered INEC to hold a rerun election. Later that month, the commission announced that the APC would not be allowed to nominate a new nominee as only eligible nominees from the annulled election would be allowed to run, it also set the date for the by-election for February 6. Shehu Saleh Rijau, the APGA nominee, defeated the PDP's Emmanuel Alamu by 1% and less than 500 votes. The election had 29.33% turnout, slightly less than the annulled election's 31.94% turnout, and was conducted successfully according to INEC officials.

Aba North/Aba South Federal Constituency by-election 

On February 9, 2021, Aba North/Aba South Representative Ossy Prestige (APGA) died from an undisclosed illness. Later in February, INEC set the date for the by-election for March 27 with party primaries taking place between March 4 and March 10. Chimaobi Ebisike, the PDP nominee, defeated the APC's Mascot Uzor Kalu by 42% and over 6,600 votes. The election was marred by both extremely low turnout, at 3.29%, and violence with a bombing at the Umuola Hall polling station and the kidnapping of an APC collation officer.

Gwaram Federal Constituency by-election 

On March 4, 2021, Gwaram Representative Yuguda Hassan-Kila (APC) died from an undisclosed illness. In May, INEC set the date for the by-election for June 19 with party primaries taking place between May 18 and May 24. Yusuf Galami, the APC nominee, defeated the PDP's Kamilu Inuwa by over 47% and nearly 20,000 votes. The election had 31.59% turnout and was conducted peacefully according to participating voters and INEC officials.

Lere Federal Constituency by-election 

On April 6, 2021, Lere Representative Suleiman Aliyu (APC) died from an undisclosed illness. In July, INEC set the date for the by-election for August 14 with party primaries taking place between July 13 and July 24. Ahmed Munir, the APC nominee, defeated the PDP's Ibrahim Usman by 35% and over 18,000 votes. The election had 22.85% turnout and was conducted peacefully according to journalists.

See also 
 2021 Nigerian state legislative elections

References 

House by-elections
2021 House